Rajanpur , is a tehsil located in  Rajanpur District, Punjab, Pakistan. It is administratively subdivided into 16 Union Councils, two of which form the tehsil capital Rajanpur.

References

Rajanpur District
Tehsils of Punjab, Pakistan